Newell is an unincorporated community in Randolph County, Alabama, United States, located  north-northeast of Wedowee.

History
Newell was named after the family of W. P. Newell, who was elected as sheriff of Randolph County in 1845. Newell also served as a member of the Alabama House of Representatives from 1853 to 1855. He later served as the mayor of Camp Hill, Alabama.

A post office was established under the name Newell in 1887. The post office was closed on October 5, 2002.

See also

References

External links

Unincorporated communities in Randolph County, Alabama
Unincorporated communities in Alabama